KCCE may refer to:

 KCCE (AM), a radio station (1340 AM) licensed to serve San Angelo, Texas, United States
 KCCE-LP, a defunct low-power television station (channel 50) formerly licensed to serve San Luis Obispo, California, United States